United Nations Security Council resolution 652, adopted unanimously on 17 April 1990, after examining the application of the Republic of Namibia for membership in the United Nations, the Council recommended to the General Assembly that Namibia be admitted.

Namibia became the 160th member of the United Nations on 23 April 1990, after being a German colony and ruled by South Africa under its mandate of South West Africa for 75 years. The United States ambassador Thomas R. Pickering said on the passing of the resolution, "Namibia's birth has been protracted and difficult, but it now appears that the star under which she comes into the world shines brightly."

See also
 Member states of the United Nations
 List of United Nations Security Council Resolutions 601 to 700 (1987–1991)
 Namibian War of Independence
 Tripartite Accord

References

External links
 
Text of the Resolution at undocs.org

 0652
 0652
 0652
1990 in Namibia
April 1990 events